Stolen Life is an upcoming Philippine television drama series to be broadcast by GMA Network. Directed by Jerry Sineneng, it stars Carla Abellana, Beauty Gonzalez and Gabby Concepcion. It is set to premiere on July 3, 2023, on the network's Afternoon Prime lineup.

Premise
When a criminal performs astral projection to switch physical body with her cousin, a life will be stolen and forced to be prisoned. The cousin will plan to regain her family and life.

Cast and characters
Lead cast
 Carla Abellana as Lucy
 Beauty Gonzalez as Farrah Dela Cruz
 Gabby Concepcion as Darius Rigor

Supporting cast
 Celia Rodriguez as Azon Rigor
 Divine Aucina as Joyce
 Anjo Damiles as Vince
 Lovely Rivero as Belen 
 William Lorenzo as Ernesto

Production
Principal photography commenced in February 2023.

References

Filipino-language television shows
GMA Network drama series
Television shows set in the Philippines
Upcoming drama television series